Robelmont (Gaumais: Roubiémont) is a village of Wallonia and a district of the municipality of Meix-devant-Virton, located in the province of Luxembourg, Belgium. 

The asteroid 1145 Robelmonte is named after the village, in honour of the astronomer Sylvain Arend (1902–1992), who was born there.

History
Between 1968 and 1971 a Gallo-Roman villa was excavated.

The current parish church, dedicated to St Martin, was built in 1894.

During the Battle of the Ardennes (21-23 August 1914), there was fighting in and around Robelmont between French and German forces.

Notable people
 Nicolaus Vernulaeus (1583–1649)
 Sylvain Arend (1902–1992)

Village committee
The annual activities in the village are led by the village's party planning committee.

References

Former municipalities of Luxembourg (Belgium)
Meix-devant-Virton